Dieteria canascens (formerly Machaeranthera canescens) is an annual plant or short lived perennial plant in the family Asteraceae, known by the common names hoary tansyaster and hoary-aster.

"Canescens" means "gray-hairy".

Range and habitat
Dieteria canascens is native to western and central North America, from the Pacific Coast to the Western part of the Great Plains, from British Columbia south to California, Sonora, and Chihuahua, east to Saskatchewan, the Dakotas, and Oklahoma, with a few isolated populations in Iowa and Minnesota.

Growth pattern
Dieteria canascens is a woolly-haired, glandular annual or perennial herb with one or more branching stems sometimes exceeding  in height.

Leaves and stems

The stems are glandular with short hairs.

Flowers and fruits
The inflorescence bears one or more flower heads lined with several layers of pointed, curling or curving phyllaries. The head has a center of many yellow disc florets and a fringe of blue or purple ray florets each 1 to 2 centimeters long. The fruit is an achene around 3 millimeters in length tipped with a pappus of long hairs.

A number of insects can often be found in the flowers.

Uses
The Zuni people take an infusion the whole plant of subspecies canescens, variety canescens and rub it on the abdomen as an emetic.

Varieties
 Dieteria canescens var. ambigua (B.L.Turner) D.R.Morgan & R.L.Hartm. – Arizona, Colorado, New Mexico
 Dieteria canescens var. aristata (Eastw.) D.R.Morgan & R.L.Hartm. – Arizona, Colorado, New Mexico, Utah
 Dieteria canescens var. canescens – Alberta, British Columbia, Saskatchewan; Arizona, California, Colorado, Idaho, Montana, Nebraska, Nevada, North Dakota, Oregon, South Dakota, Utah, Wyoming
 Dieteria canescens var. glabra (A.Gray) D.R.Morgan & R.L.Hartm. – Arizona, Colorado, Kansas, New Mexico, Texas, Wyoming, Chihuahua
 Dieteria canescens var. incana (Lindl.) D.R.Morgan & R.L.Hartm. – Nebraska, South Dakota
 Dieteria canescens var. leucanthemifolia (Greene) D.R.Morgan & R.L.Hartm. – California, Nevada, Utah
 Dieteria canescens var. nebraskana (B.L.Turner) D.R.Morgan & R.L.Hartm. – Nebraska, South Dakota
 Dieteria canescens var. sessiliflora (Nutt.) D.R.Morgan & R.L.Hartm. – Idaho
 Dieteria canescens var. shastensis (A.Gray) D.R.Morgan & R.L.Hartm. – California, Nevada, Oregon
 Dieteria canescens var. ziegleri (Munz) D.R.Morgan & R.L.Hartm. – Santa Rosa Mountains  in Riverside County in California

References

External links
Jepson Manual Treatment
United States Department of Agriculture Plants Profile
Calphotos Photo gallery, University of California

Astereae
Plants used in traditional Native American medicine
Flora of North America
Plants described in 1840